Luan Haradinaj (November 17, 1973 – May 6, 1997) was a Kosovo Liberation Army soldier who died during the fight with Serbian/Yugoslav forces in Qafë Prush, at the border of that time of Yugoslavia and Albania.

Early life and education
Luan was born on 17 November 1973 in the village of Glloxhan, near Deçan, in Kosovo, then part of Yugoslavia. His paternal descent is from Berishë in northern Albania, around the city of Pukë. He spent his youth in his native village with his parents and siblings, and completed primary school in Rznić and secondary school in Dečani and Gjakova. His elder brother Ramush Haradinaj was former Prime Minister of Kosovo.

Military career
Luan with his brother Shkelzen Haradinaj and their fellow comrades were among the first nuclei of armed resistance in the Dukagjin in November 1993. From that time, Luan and his with brothers, Ramush, Shkelzen, Daut and friends of the cause, including Lahi Brahimaj, Agim Zeneli, Adrian Krasniqi, began to organize armed groups. Having demonstrated diligence and organizational skills, the Kosovo Liberation Army General Staff, assigned Luan to be the task of chief of logistics in 1994. Besides working on supplying weapons to future Kosovo Liberation Army fighters, Luan also participated in organizing and conducting a series of combat actions against the Serbian police, especially at strategic points and at police stations in Deçan. Luan stood out among his companions for his honesty, solidarity, and the care he showed for them when crossing the border. Since his military cause had not stopped for many years, he had memorized the paths to cross, where he was always in the front rows of liberators.

Military education in Albania
During his stay in Albania, Luan was introduced to a wide circle of soldiers from all captive Albanian lands, especially Kosovo. Luan also maintained contact with Kosovo Liberation Army commander Adem Jashari, Rexhep Selimi and Sylejman Selimi, Abedin Rexha and Fehmi Lladrovci. He has maintained contacts with Zahir Pajaziti and Ilir Konusevci. The contribution of the Haradinaj brothers to the expansion and consolidation of the ranks of the Kosovo Liberation Army is a very important chapter of struggle for freedom, while the momentum, temperament, ingenuity and determination of Luan Haradinaj have remained in the memory of soldiers of  the Kosovo Liberation Army.  In the face of the occupation forces in the spring of 1997, numerous liberation groups went from Kosovo to Albania and from Albania to Kosovo, although Serbian occupation forces had reinforced all crossings, the first Kosovo Liberation Army soldiers and rescuers had penetrated. The boundary that once divided the territories of Federal Republic of Yugoslavia and Albania, however, had begun to become passable to Kosovo Liberation Army soldiers, at any time of the year, at any time of day or night.

Death
On May 6, 1997, Luan Haradinaj, along with his brother Ramush Haradinaj and other Kosovo Liberation Army soldiers had taken a route to cross the border near the village of Vlahne of Has, in the direction of Kuzhin. On that day, the Serbian forces had set up an ambush. Luan was leading the soldiers, and was first to be ambushed by the Serbian military and police forces. Rafet Rama was also seriously injured, and Ramush Haradinaj and Fehmi Lladrovci were wounded. In those moments, armed conflict had begun. The Yugoslav forces hit with heavy artillery in order to annihilate all Albanian terrorists. After many attempts and a frantic counterattack by the Kosovo Liberation Army, Ramush Haradinaj managed to get closer to his brother's body. Upon seeing Luan Haradinaj lying on his face, Ramush discovered that Luan had fallen. Under a barrage of enemy grenades and bullets, Ramush Haradinaj managed to retrieve his brother's body. After four hours of travel, retreating from enemy fire, Ramush and his comrades carried Luan's body and headed to the village of Vlahne. There, they buried Luan. His brothers, companions and fellow fighters continued their way of liberation until June 21, 1999, when Serbian forces were expelled from Kosovo by a joint effort of the Kosovo Liberation Army and NATO.

Legacy
On August 24, 1999, Luan's body was removed from his burial ground in Vlahne and re-buried in his native village. In honor and commemoration of his work, the General Staff of the Liberation Army and the President of Kosovo Hashim Thaçi described Luan Haradinaj as the heart and soul of the Kosovo Liberation Army.

References

1973 births
1997 deaths
Kosovo Liberation Army soldiers
Kosovo Albanians